Simon Olofsson (born April 22, 1999) is a Swedish curler.

He is a 2019 Swedish mixed curling champion and skipped the Swedish team at the 2019 World Mixed Curling Championship.

Personal life
Olofsson attended Uppsala University.

Teams

Men's

Mixed

References

External links
 
 Olofsson, Simon | Nordic Junior Curling Tour
 

Living people
Swedish male curlers
Swedish curling champions
1999 births
21st-century Swedish people
Uppsala University alumni
Competitors at the 2023 Winter World University Games